The Rural Municipality of Riding Mountain West is a rural municipality (RM) in the Canadian province of Manitoba.  It is located in Manitoba's Parkland region, between Riding Mountain National Park near the province's western border with Saskatchewan.

History

The Rural Municipality of Riding Mountain West was incorporated on January 1, 2015, via the amalgamation of the RMs of Shellmouth-Boulton and Silver Creek. It was formed as a requirement of The Municipal Amalgamations Act, which required that municipalities with a population less than 1,000 amalgamate with one or more neighbouring municipalities by 2015. The Government of Manitoba initiated these amalgamations in order for municipalities to meet the 1997 minimum population requirement of 1,000 to incorporate a municipality. The RM of Shellmouth–Boulton was created through an earlier amalgamation of the RMs of Boulton and Shellmouth in 1999.

Communities
Constituent communities of Riding Mountain West include:
Angusville
 Cracknell
 Dropmore
 Endcliffe
 Inglis (local urban district)
 Lennard
 Petlura
 Shellmouth
 Silverton

Demographics 

Attractions 

 Asessippi Provincial Park
 Asessippi Ski Area
 Inglis Grain Elevators
 Riding Mountain National Park
 Shellmouth Reservoir
 Trans Canada Trail — runs through Angusville

References 

Rural municipalities in Manitoba
2015 establishments in Manitoba
Manitoba municipal amalgamations, 2015
Populated places established in 2015